Sticky Fingers is the 9th British and 11th American studio album by the English rock band the Rolling Stones.  The Stones released it on 23 April 1971 on their new, and own label Rolling Stones Records.   They had been contracted by Decca Records and London Records in the UK and the US since 1963.  On this album Mick Taylor made his second full-length appearance on a Rolling Stones album (after the live album Get Yer Ya-Ya's Out!).  It was the first studio album without Brian Jones who died two years earlier. The original cover artwork, conceived by Andy Warhol and photographed and designed by members of his art collective, The Factory, showed a picture of a man in tight jeans, and had a working zip that opened to reveal underwear fabric. The cover was expensive to produce and damaged the vinyl record, so later re-issues featured just the outer photograph of the jeans.

The album featured a return to basics for the Rolling Stones. The unusual instrumentation introduced several albums prior was absent; most songs featuring drums, guitar, bass, and percussion as provided by the key members: Mick Jagger (lead vocal, various percussion and rhythm guitar), Keith Richards (guitar and backing vocal), Mick Taylor (guitar), Bill Wyman (bass guitar), and Charlie Watts (drums). Additional contributions were made by long-time Stones collaborators including saxophonist Bobby Keys and keyboardists Billy Preston, Jack Nitzsche, Ian Stewart, and Nicky Hopkins. As with the other albums of the Rolling Stones late 1960s/early 1970s period, it was produced by Jimmy Miller.

Sticky Fingers is considered one of the Rolling Stones' best albums. It was the band's first album to reach number one on both the UK albums and US albums charts, and has since achieved triple platinum certification in the US. "Brown Sugar” topped the Billboard Hot 100 in 1971. Sticky Fingers was voted the second best album of the year in The Village Voices annual Pazz & Jop critics poll for 1971, based on American critics' votes. The album is inducted in the Grammy Hall of Fame and included in Rolling Stone magazine's 500 Greatest Albums of All Time list.

Background
With the end of their Decca/London association at hand, the Rolling Stones were finally free to release their albums (cover art and all) as they pleased. However, their departing manager Allen Klein dealt the group a major blow when they discovered that they had inadvertently signed over their entire 1960s American copyrights to Klein and his company ABKCO, which is how all of their material from 1963's "Come On" to Get Yer Ya-Ya's Out! The Rolling Stones in Concert has since been released solely in America by ABKCO Records. The band later sued for their return but without success, settling in 1984. The band would remain incensed with Klein for decades for that act. Klein died in 2009.

When Decca informed the Rolling Stones that they were owed one more single, the band submitted a track called "Cocksucker Blues", correctly assuming that this would be refused. Instead, Decca released the two-year-old Beggars Banquet track "Street Fighting Man" while Klein retained dual copyright ownership in conjunction with The Rolling Stones of "Brown Sugar" and "Wild Horses."

Recording
Although sessions for Sticky Fingers began in earnest in March 1970, the Rolling Stones had been recording at Muscle Shoals Sound Studio in Alabama in December 1969, where they cut "You Gotta Move," "Brown Sugar" and "Wild Horses." "Sister Morphine," cut during Let It Bleeds sessions earlier in March of that year, had been held over from that release. Much of the recording for Sticky Fingers was made with the Rolling Stones' mobile studio in Stargroves during the summer and autumn of 1970. Early versions of songs that would eventually appear on Exile on Main St. were also rehearsed during these sessions.

 Music and lyrics 
Sticky Fingers originally included 10 tracks. The music has been characterised by commentators as hard rock, roots rock and rock and roll. According to Rolling Stone magazine, it is "the Stones' most downbeat, druggy album, with new guitarist Mick Taylor stretching into jazz and country".

Artwork
Standard version

The artwork emphasised the innuendo of the Sticky Fingers title, showing a close-up of a jeans-clad male crotch with the visible outline of a penis. The cover of the original vinyl LP featured a working zipper and perforations around the belt buckle that opened to reveal a sub-cover image of white briefs. The vinyl release displayed the band's name and album title along the belt; behind the zipper, the underpants were seemingly rubber stamped in gold with the stylised name of American pop artist Andy Warhol, below which read "THIS PHOTOGRAPH MAY NOT BE—ETC." The artwork was conceived by Warhol, but the photography was by Billy Name and the design by Craig Braun. Braun and his team suggested wrapping the album in rolling paper – a concept later used by Cheech & Chong in Big Bambu – but Jagger was enthused by Warhol's concept. Warhol duly sent Braun Polaroid pictures of a model in tight jeans.

The photo of the crotch was assumed by fans to be Mick Jagger, but people involved in the photo shoot claim Warhol photographed several men (not including Jagger) and never revealed which shots he used. Among the candidates, Jed Johnson, Warhol's lover at the time, denied it was his likeness, although his twin brother Jay is a possibility. Those closest to the shoot, and subsequent design, name Factory artist and designer Corey Tippin as the likeliest candidate. Warhol "superstar" Joe Dallesandro claims to have been the model.

When retailers complained that the zipper damaged the vinyl (from stacked shipments), the zipper was "unzipped" slightly to the middle of the record, where damage would be minimised.

For the initial vinyl release the album title and band name is smaller and at the top on the American release. For the UK release, the title and band name are in bigger letters and on the left.

The album introduced the tongue and lips logo of Rolling Stones Records, designed by John Pasche in 1970. Jagger suggested to Pasche that he copy the out-stuck tongue of the Hindu goddess Kali. Pasche felt that would date the image to the Indian culture craze of the 1960s, but seeing Kali changed his mind. Before the end of that year, his basic version was faxed to Craig Braun by Marshall Chess. The black and white copy was modified by Braun and his team, resulting in the popular red version: the slim one with the two white stripes on the tongue. 

Critic Sean Egan wrote: "Without using the Stones' name, it instantly conjures them, or at least Jagger, as well as a certain lasciviousness that is the Stones' own… It quickly and deservedly became the most famous logo in the history of popular music." The tongue and lips design was part of a package that, in 2003, VH1 named the "No. 1 Greatest Album Cover" of all time.

Alternative version and covers
In Spain, the original cover was censored by the Franco regime and replaced with a "Can of fingers" cover, designed by John Pasche and Phil Jude, and "Sister Morphine" was replaced by a live version of Chuck Berry's "Let It Rock."  This track was later included on the CD compilation Rarities 1971–2003 in 2005.

In 1992, the LP release of the album in Russia featured a similar treatment as the original cover; but with Cyrillic lettering for the band name and album name, a colourised photograph of blue jeans with a zipper, and a Soviet Army uniform belt buckle that shows a hammer and sickle inscribed in a star. The model appears to be female.

Release and reception

Sticky Fingers was released on 23 April 1971 and hit the number one spot on the British charts in May 1971, remaining there for four weeks before returning at number one for a further week in mid June. In the US, the album hit number one within days of release, and stayed there for four weeks. The album spent a total of 69 weeks on the Billboard 200. According to Billboards Top 200 list, it was one of many albums that topped the German chart that year.

In a contemporary review for the Los Angeles Times, music critic Robert Hilburn said that although Sticky Fingers is one of the best rock albums of the year, it is only "modest" by the Rolling Stones' standards and succeeds on the strength of songs such as "Bitch" and "Dead Flowers," which recall the band's previously uninhibited, furious style. Jon Landau, writing in Rolling Stone, felt that it lacks the spirit and spontaneity of the Rolling Stones' previous two albums and, apart from "Moonlight Mile", is full of "forced attempts at style and control" in which the band sounds disinterested, particularly on formally correct songs such as "Brown Sugar." Writing for Rolling Stone in 2015, David Fricke called it "an eclectic affirmation of maturing depth" and the band's "sayonara to a messy 1969". In a positive review, Lynn Van Matre of the Chicago Tribune viewed the album as the band "at their raunchy best" and wrote that, although it is "hardly innovative," it is consistent enough to be one of the year's best albums. Writing for Slate, Jack Hamilton praised the album in a retrospective review, stating that it was "one of the greatest albums in rock 'n' roll history."

Sticky Fingers was voted the second best album of the year in The Village Voices annual Pazz & Jop critics poll for 1971. Lester Bangs voted it number one in the poll and said that it was his most played album of the year. Robert Christgau, the poll's creator, ranked the album 17th on his own year-end list. In a 1975 article for The Village Voice, Christgau suggested that the release was "triffling with decadence", but might be the Rolling Stones' best album, approached only by Exile on Main St. (1972). In Christgau's Record Guide: Rock Albums of the Seventies (1981), he wrote that it reflected how unapologetic the band was after the Altamont Free Concert and that, despite the concession to sincerity with "Wild Horses", songs such as "Can't You Hear Me Knocking" and "I Got the Blues" are as "soulful" as "Good Times," and their cover of "You Gotta Move" is on-par with their previous covers of "Prodigal Son" and "Love in Vain."

 Re-releases 
In 1994, Sticky Fingers was remastered and reissued by Virgin Records.  This remaster was initially released in a Collector's Edition CD, which replicated in miniature many elements of the original vinyl album packaging, including the zipper.  Sticky Fingers was remastered again in 2009 by Universal Music Enterprises and in 2011 by Universal Music Enterprises in a Japanese-only SHM-SACD version.

In June 2015, the Rolling Stones reissued Sticky Fingers (in its 2009 remastering) in a variety of formats to coincide with a new concert tour, the Zip Code Tour. The Deluxe and Super Deluxe versions of the reissue featured previously unreleased bonus material (depending on the format): alternative takes of some songs, live tracks recorded on 14 March 1971 at the Roundhouse (venue), London, and the complete 13 March 1971 show at Leeds University. It re-entered the UK Albums chart at number 7, extending their UK Top 10 album chart span beyond 51 years and 2 months since their self-titled debuted at number 7 on 23 April 1964.
It also re-entered the US Albums chart at number 5, extending their US Top 10 album chart span beyond 50 years and 6 months since 12 x 5 on 14 December 1964.

 Legacy 
Sticky Fingers was the first album released by the group in the post-Klein era and was listed among the 1999 class of Grammy Hall of Fame inductees. According to Acclaimed Music, it is the 53rd most celebrated album in popular music history.

In 1994, Sticky Fingers was ranked number ten in Colin Larkin's All Time Top 1000 Albums. He stated, "Dirty rock like this has still to be bettered, and there is still no rival in sight." In a retrospective review, Q magazine said that the album was "the Stones at their assured, showboating peak ... A magic formula of heavy soul, junkie blues and macho rock." NME wrote that it "captures the Stones bluesy swagger" in a "dark-land where few dare to tread." Record Collector magazine said that it showcases Jagger and Richards as they "delve even further back to the primitive blues that first inspired them and step up their investigations into another great American form, country." In his review for Goldmine magazine, Dave Thompson wrote that the album still is superior to "most of The Rolling Stones' catalog."

Sticky Fingers was listed as No. 63 on Rolling Stone magazine's 2003 list of The 500 Greatest Albums of All Time, No. 64 in a 2012 revised list, and No. 104 in a 2020 reboot of the list. In a 2018 retrospective review, The Guardian's Alexis Petridis ranked it the best album the band had ever produced, stating "their claim to be The Greatest Rock’n’Roll Band in the World has no more compelling evidence than the flawless 46 minutes of music here."

David Hepworth wrote in his 2016 book Never a Dull Moment that the contributions of guest performers like Keys, Jim Dickinson, and Preston made the album contain "more musical range than any other Rolling Stones album," such as "Dickinson's honky-tonk piano on 'Wild Horses'" and "Preston's churchy organ solo on 'I Got the Blues'." Hepworth also suggested that Taylor's "Latin-flavored guitar solo" on "Can't You Hear Me Knocking" was influenced by Santana's 1970 album Abraxas.

Track listing
Original release

Deluxe edition (2015)

Super Deluxe edition (2015)

Personnel
 Track credits are noted in parenthesis and based on CD numbering.The Rolling Stones Mick Jaggerlead vocal , backing vocals , acoustic guitar , castanets , maracas , electric guitar , percussion 
 Keith Richardselectric guitar , acoustic guitar , backing vocals 
 Mick Taylorelectric guitar , acoustic guitar 
 Bill Wymanbass guitar , electric piano 
 Charlie Wattsdrums Additional personnel Paul Buckmasterstring arrangement 
 Ry Cooderslide guitar 
 Jim Dickinsonpiano 
 Rocky Dijoncongas 
 Nicky Hopkinspiano 
 Bobby Keystenor saxophone 
 Jimmy Millerpercussion 
 Jack Nitzschepiano 
 Billy Prestonorgan 
 Jim Pricetrumpet, piano 
 Ian Stewartpiano Technical'
 Glyn Johnsengineer
 Andy Johnsengineer
 Chris Kimseyengineer
 Jimmy Johnsonengineer
 Doug Saxmastering engineer
 Andy WarholCover concept/photography

Charts

Weekly charts

Year-end charts

Certifications

See also 
 Album era
 List of Canadian number-one albums of 1971
 List of number-one albums in Australia during the 1970s
 List of number-one albums from the 1970s (UK)

References

Further reading

External links
 

1971 albums
The Rolling Stones albums
Rolling Stones Records albums
Albums produced by Jimmy Miller
Albums recorded at Olympic Sound Studios
Albums recorded at Muscle Shoals Sound Studio
Albums recorded at Trident Studios
Albums recorded in a home studio
Albums arranged by Paul Buckmaster
Albums with cover art by Andy Warhol
Atlantic Records albums
Virgin Records albums